Kimberley College (also known as STEM College) is a free school sixth form centre that opened in Stewartby, Bedfordshire, England in April 2014. The college is operated by Wootton Academy Trust, who also operate Wootton Upper School.

Kimberley College specialises in STEM (Science, Technology, Engineering and Mathematics), and offers a range of A levels and BTECs related to the specialisms. The college accepts students from Bedford, Bletchley and Milton Keynes, as well as the villages in between these areas.

References

External links
 Kimberley College official website

Free schools in England
Education in the Borough of Bedford
Educational institutions established in 2013
2013 establishments in England